Landberk was a Swedish prog/art rock band, characterized by the dark, sombre tone of their music. They were notable for their utilisation of the mellotron, which was as important as the guitar in their melodies. They also recorded a cover version of No More White Horses, a song by Please, an almost forgotten psychedelic rock band of the 1960s.

Discography

Studio albums
 Riktigt Äkta, 1992
 Lonely Land (English version of Riktigt Äkta), 1992
 One Man Tell's Another, 1994 
 Indian Summer, 1996

Live recordings
 Unaffected, 1995

Singles and promotional recordings
 Jag Är Tiden, 1994
 Dream Dance, 1995

External links 
 full discography and track list
 excellent article about Landberk (in russian)
 reference about the two '92 albums being the same, but different demographic versions

Swedish progressive rock groups
Musical groups established in 1992